Tenfu Tea or Ten Fu, (also Tian Fu Tea) is the name of a China-based company that specializes in tea and tea food products.

See also
 Tenfu Tea College
 Tenfu Tea Online Shop

References

External links
  (English)
  (Chinese))
 Tenren Group - Official website, Taiwan

Companies based in Fujian
Tea brands in China
Tea companies of China
Tea houses